Kabuliwala ( Kābuli'ōẏālā, "Kabul wallah") is a 1957 Bengali film directed by Tapan Sinha and based on the eponymous 1892 short story by the Bengali writer Rabindranath Tagore.

Plot
Rahmat (Chhabi Biswas), a middle-age fruit seller from Afghanistan, comes to Calcutta to hawk his merchandise. He befriends a small Bengali girl called Mini (Oindrila Tagore aka Tinku Tagore) who reminds him of his daughter back in Afghanistan. He stays at a boarding house with his countrymen.

One day, Rahmat receives a letter with news of his daughter's illness; he decides to leave for his country. Since he is short of money he sells his goods on credit to increase his business. Later, when he goes to collect his money, one of his customers abuses him. In the fight that ensues, Rahmat warns that he will not tolerate abuse and stabs the guy when he does not stop.

In the court Rahmat's lawyer tries to obfuscate the facts but, in his characteristic and simple fashion, Rahmat states the truth in a matter-of-fact way. The judge, pleased with Rahmat's honesty, gives him 10 years' rigorous imprisonment instead of the death sentence.

On the day of his release he goes to meet Mini and discovers that she has grown up into a 14-year-old girl who is about to get married. Mini does not recognize the aged Rahmat, who realizes that his daughter must have forgotten him, too. Mini's father advises him to go back to his homeland and Mini's mother gives Rahmat the money for travel out of the wedding budget to which Mini agrees; she also sends a gift for Rahmat's daughter.

Cast

 Chhabi Biswas as Rahmat
 Tinku as Mini
 Radhamohan Bhattacharya as Mini's Father
 Manju Dey as Mini's Mother
 Jiben Bose as Jailor
 Asha Devi as Maid
 Md Al Amin as Photographer
 Kali Banerjee as a fellow jailmate
 Jahor Roy as Bhola, the man-servant
 Nripati Chatterjee as a borrower

Awards

National Film Awards
1956 - National Film Award for Best Feature Film
1956 - National Film Award for Best Feature Film in Bengali
Silver Bear Extraordinary Prize of the Jury - 7th Berlin International Film Festival

See also

 Kabuliwala (1961 film)

References

काबुलीवाला | रवींद्रनाथ टैगोर की श्रेष्ठ कहानियाँ |कहानी पांच वर्षीय लड़की मिनी और एक पठान द फ्रूटसेलर

External links
 
 
 Kabuliwala (1956) detailed info at www.upperstall.com
  Kabuliwala by Rabindranath Tagore Translation

Films based on works by Rabindranath Tagore
Bengali-language Indian films
1957 films
Indian children's films
Indian black-and-white films
Films directed by Tapan Sinha
Films set in Kolkata
Best Feature Film National Film Award winners
Bengali films remade in other languages
Films based on Indian novels
Films scored by Ravi Shankar
Best Bengali Feature Film National Film Award winners
1950s Bengali-language films